Lisa R. Birnbach is an author best known for co-authoring The Official Preppy Handbook, which spent 38 weeks at number one on the New York Times bestseller list in 1980.

Early life and education
Birnbach was born to a Jewish family on the Upper East Side of New York, the daughter of Naomi (née Salit) and Maks Birnbach. Her father immigrated from Germany to Mandatory Palestine prior to World War II where he was a member of the Irgun and then later immigrated to the United States where he worked as a diamond importer; her mother worked for the Jewish Museum. Her maternal grandfather, Norman Salit, was a rabbi and served as president of the Synagogue Council of America. She attended the Birch Wathen Lenox School from 1962 to 1971 and the Riverdale Country School (class of 1974). She went on to study at Barnard College for first year, before transferring to Brown University where she graduated with a Bachelor of Arts degree with Honors in Semiotics in 1978.

Career
After graduation, Birnbach toured Europe and worked for an advertising agency. From April 1979, Birnbach worked as a staff writer at The Village Voice, where she co-wrote the Scenes column. Since The Official Preppy Handbook Lisa has written an additional 15 books, for newspapers such as the New York Times, and for magazines such as Glamour, Parade, Rolling Stone, and TV Guide. She was the deputy editor of Spy magazine.

Birnbach worked as a technical consultant on the movie Dead Poets Society. She has co–hosted Good Night America and was a correspondent on The Early Show, hosting the segment, "Yikes! I'm a Grownup!" She is co–creator and co–host of ABC's Zero Hour, co–writer of the off–Broadway revue, Loose Lips, and until 2007, she hosted the comedy radio program, The Lisa Birnbach Show.

In 2010, she wrote True Prep: It’s a Whole New Old World with Chip Kidd. She appeared on the Colbert Report on 13 September 2010.

In 2022, Lisa Birnbach appeared in the Netflix docu-series The Andy Warhol Diaries, in which she retroactively criticized The Official Preppy Handbook for passages encouraging gender discrimination and homophobia. In her interview in the series, Birnbach noted that two of the contributors to the book were gay men.

Personal life
Birnbach resides in Manhattan. She was married to film producer Steven Haft known for the production of Jakob the Liar and Dead Poets Society. Haft and Birnbach have since divorced.

Birnbach was contacted by E. Jean Carroll about an alleged act of violent sexual assault by former U.S. President Donald Trump, and suggested pressing charges. On political grounds, Birnbach also criticized former President Trump and his political allies such as Mark Meadows and William Barr on her official social media.

Authored books

References

External links
 
 

Living people
1956 births
American non-fiction writers
American women non-fiction writers
Brown University alumni
Jewish American writers
People from the Upper East Side
The New Yorker people
Birch Wathen Lenox School alumni
Riverdale Country School alumni
21st-century American Jews
21st-century American women